Can't Keep It to Myself is an album by the American gospel singer Marion Williams, released in 1993. It was Williams's last album. A few months prior to the release of the album, Williams had become the first singer to win a MacArthur Award.

Production
The album was produced by Anthony Heilbut. It contains a remake of one of Williams's earliest hit recordings, "Live the Life I Sing About in My Song".

Critical reception

Ebony wrote that Williams's "spirited voice still gracefully skips down melodic mountains one soulful note at a time." Rolling Stone thought that "the hymns' structural solidity allows Williams to take flight: While she demonstrates throughout the clarity and discipline of a classical singer, she slurs and bends notes with the command of a soul performer." The Philadelphia Inquirer opined that the album "illustrates her ability to turn crawling, down-tempo gospel blues into a holy offering."

The Philadelphia Daily News concluded that "without question Williams is the most rhythmic and bluesiest of all the old-school gospel divas—close your eyes and it's not much of a stretch to envision her in Bessie Smith's place, vampin' 'Gimme a Pigfoot' speak-easy style—which is why part of the joy of the album is in the mix." The Pittsburgh Post-Gazette called Can't Keep It to Myself "an excellent primer on Williams' art, and one of the single best albums of the year." The San Diego Union-Tribune wrote that Williams "unleashes that voice with sustained passion and pinpoint control, swooping and soaring with the fervor of a blues queen and the fluidity of a jazz diva."

AllMusic deemed the album "awesome performances recorded with minimal, sympathetic accompaniment and little production support; just mostly Williams' smashing, note-bending, soaring vocals."

Track listing

References

1993 albums
Shanachie Records albums